The Wisdom of Crocodiles (also released as Immortality) is a 1998 British romantic thriller film directed by Po-Chih Leong and starring Jude Law. It is based on the book of the same name by Paul Hoffman.

Plot

Cast 
 Jude Law as Steven Grlscz

 Grlscz's Women
 Elina Löwensohn as Anne Levels 
 Kerry Fox as Maria Vaughan

 Police
 Timothy Spall as Inspector Healey
 Jack Davenport as Sergeant Roche

 Gang
 Ashley Artus as Gang Leader
 Tom Wu as Gang Member
 Hon Ping Tang as Gang Member
 Antony Cotton as Gang Member
 Richard Mylan as Gang Member
 Carlton Headley as Gang Member
 Neran Persaud as Gang Member

 Supporting Cast
 Julia Davies as Girl In Operating Theatre
 Carlton Jarvis as Physician (uncredited)
 Colin Salmon as Martin
 Hitler Wong as "Noodles" Chan
 Stuart Bowman as Car Crash Mechanic
 C.J. December as Car Crash Mechanic
 Anastasia Hille as Karen
 Nicholas Lamont (as Nick Lamont) as Toll Bridge Attendant
 Joseph O'Conor as Mr. Nancarrow
 Rupert Farley as Priest
 Diane Howse as Mrs. Healey
 Cliff Parisi as Labourer
 Vincent Keane as Injured Workman

Reception 
Rotten Tomatoes gave it a total score of 47% and Metacritic gave it 58/100.

Richard Corliss of Time liked the film, claiming "... this cool, handsome thriller proceeds with an elliptical elegance." Others, however, were not as kind; Elvis Mitchell of Rolling Stone dismissed it as "bloodless", with dialogue that "sounds like the kind of florid pick-up lines better used on second-year literature students or the kind of lonely women seen only in movies," while Paul Tatara of CNN called it "stylish but anemic".

The film won the 1999 Grand Prize of European Fantasy Film in Silver at the Brussels International Festival of Fantasy Film.

See also 
 Vampire film

References

External links 
 
 
 
 

1998 films
1990s English-language films
1998 romantic drama films
1990s psychological thriller films
British vampire films
Films set in London
British drama films
1990s British films